Gayatri Devi alias Gayatri Yadav (born 1964) is a member of the Bharatiya Janata Party from Bihar. She won the Bihar Legislative Assembly election in 2015 from Parihar.

Early life and education 
Devi was born in a village Koili Bhraon of Muzaffarpur district in Bihar state. She has passed grade 9th.

Personal life 
Devi is the wife of former BJP MLA Ram Naresh Prasad Yadav. Her husband Ram Naresh Yadav is in jail related to Sitamarhi collectorate gun firing case.

Political career 
In 1990 Devi joined politics. She held various positions in Sitamarhi BJP female wing. In 2015 Bihar Assembly elections she contested as BJP candidate from Parihar Vidhan Sabha constituency. She defeated her nearest rival Ramchandra Purve of RJD.

References

Living people
People from West Champaran district
Bharatiya Janata Party politicians from Bihar
Bihar MLAs 2015–2020
Bihar MLAs 2020–2025
Women members of the Bihar Legislative Assembly
1964 births
21st-century Indian women politicians